He Rong (born 12 October 1962) is a Chinese jurist who currently serves as the Minister of Justice of China since February 2023. She previously served as executive vice president of the Supreme People's Court of China from 2020 to 2023 and deputy party secretary of Shaanxi province from 2018 to 2020.

Early life and education
He Rong was born in Linyi County, Dezhou, Shandong, China.

He Rong received a Bachelor of Law with a major in economic law from the China University of Political Science and Law in 1984, a Master of Laws in civil and commercial law from the University of Technology Sydney in 2004, and a Doctor of Law in procedural law from the China University of Political Science and Law in 2006.

Career 
She joined the Communist Party of China in June 1984. A law school graduate, she joined the Beijing Municipal Higher People's Court in August 1984 as an assistant judge of the court's First Criminal Tribunal and a clerk of its Research Office. She then worked at the Higher People's Court as a tribunal clerk, assistant judge, researcher, judge, director of the research office, and member of the court's judicial committee until July 2001.

She served as deputy president of the Beijing Municipal Higher People's Court from 2001 to 2007, president of the Beijing Municipal Second Intermediate People's Court from 2007 to 2010, and deputy president and deputy party secretary of the Beijing Municipal Higher People's Court from 2010 to 2011.

In December 2011, she began serving on the Supreme People's Court as part of the court jury. She served as vice president of the Supreme People's Court from 2013 to 2017. In March 2017, He was named a member of the Shaanxi provincial party standing committee and then in March 2018, she was named deputy party secretary of Shaanxi province. He returned to Beijing in 2020 and served as executive vice president of the Supreme People's Court from 2020 to 2023.

In February 2023, succeeding Tang Yijun, He was appointed as the Minster of Justice of China by the Standing Committee of the National People's Congress.

References

1962 births
Living people
People from Dezhou
21st-century Chinese women politicians
21st-century Chinese politicians
Chinese Communist Party politicians from Shandong
Ministers of Justice of the People's Republic of China
Female justice ministers
People's Republic of China politicians from Shandong
Deputy Communist Party secretaries of Shaanxi
Members of the 20th Central Committee of the Chinese Communist Party
China University of Political Science and Law alumni
University of Technology Sydney Law School alumni